Laura is a southern Italian village and hamlet (frazione) of Capaccio, a municipality in the province of Salerno, Campania. As of 2001 its population was of 1,301.

History
On September 9, 1943, the beaches of Laura and Paestum were the landing points of the U.S. Fifth Army during the Operation Avalanche,  part of the Allied invasion of Italy.

Geography
Located in the northern side of Cilentan Coast, nearby the mouth of Sele river, Laura lies a few km from the Ancient Greek city of Paestum and the village of Capaccio Scalo. It is 12 km far from Capaccio, 14 from Agropoli, 25 from Eboli, 22 from Battipaglia and 36 from Salerno.

The inhabited area extends along the main road and by the Tyrrhenian coastline, that is part of the Nature Reserve Foce Sele-Tanagro. The urban expansion, as well as to the surrounding villages, began in the late 20th century, because of the seaside tourism and the proximity to the ruins of Paestum.

Transport
Crossed in the middle by the provincial highway SP 175/B that links Salerno to Agropoli by the coast, Laura is few km far from the national highway SS 18 Naples-Reggio Calabria and from the railway stations of Capaccio-Roccadaspide and Paestum.

See also
Cilentan dialect
Cilento and Vallo di Diano National Park

References

External links

Frazioni of the Province of Salerno
Localities of Cilento